Imagine is a series of simulation video games primarily for the Nintendo DS, Nintendo 3DS, Microsoft Windows, and Wii game consoles, released from October 2007 to February 2013. Imagine video games are aimed primarily at girls aged six to fourteen and are published by Ubisoft.

Background 
The Imagine series of games allows players to take on the role of various occupations, such as a fashion designer, rock star, movie star or teacher. Ubisoft became a leader in publishing "games for girls" for the Nintendo DS and Wii through the Imagine, Ener-G, and Petz series.

Reception 
IGN stated that Imagine games vary wildly in quality, describing some games as "boring and soulless cash-ins that serves no purpose other than to financially take advantage of uninformed teenage girls" and others as "surprise hits [that] turned out pretty darn well."

Games 
 Imagine: Master Chef (October 2007) (known as Imagine: Happy Cooking in Europe)
 Imagine: Fashion Designer (October 2007)
 Imagine: Animal Doctor (October 2007) (known as Imagine: Pet Vet in Europe)
 Imagine: Babyz (October 2007) (known as Imagine: Babies in PAL regions)
 Imagine: Figure Skater (January 29, 2008)
 Imagine: Rock Star (March 1, 2008) (known as Imagine: Girls Band in Australia and Imagine: Girl Band in Europe)
 Imagine: Teacher (April 15, 2008)
 My Secret World by Imagine (May 3, 2008)
 Imagine: Babysitters (June 5, 2008) (known as Imagine: Baby Club in Europe)
 Imagine: Modern Dancer (June 28, 2008) (known as Ener-G Dance Squad in North America)
 Imagine: Fashion Designer New York (July 20, 2008) (known as Imagine: Fashion Model in Europe)
 Imagine: Champion Rider (August 11, 2008)
 Imagine: Pet Hospital (September 4, 2008)
 Imagine: Interior Designer (October 6, 2008)
 Imagine: Wedding Designer (October 31, 2008) (known as Imagine: Dream Weddings in Europe)
 Imagine: Party Babyz (November 12, 2008)
 Imagine: Ballet Star (November 27, 2008) (known as Imagine: Ballet Dancer in Europe)
 Imagine: Movie Star (December 2, 2008)
 Imagine: Gymnast (December 18, 2008)
 Imagine: My Restaurant (January 1, 2009) (known as Gourmet Chef: Cook Your Way to Fame in US)
 Imagine: Fashion Party (January 28, 2009)
 Imagine: Cheerleader (February 14, 2009)
 Imagine: Ice Champions (March 11, 2009)
 Imagine: Family Doctor (March 27, 2009)
 Imagine: Makeup Artist (April 12, 2009)
 Imagine: Music Fest (May 16, 2009)
 Imagine: Boutique Owner (June 2, 2009)
 Imagine: Soccer Captain (July 11, 2009)
 Imagine: Teacher: Class Trip (August 5, 2009) (known as Imagine: Teacher: School Trip in Europe)
 Imagine: Detective (September 5, 2009)
 Imagine: Party Planner (September 15, 2009)
 Imagine: Salon Stylist (September 19, 2009) (known as Imagine Beauty Stylist in Europe)
 Imagine: Reporter (September 28, 2009) (known as Imagine Journalist in Europe)
 Imagine: Zookeeper (October 6, 2009)
 Imagine: Artist (October 23, 2009)
 Imagine: Fashion Designer World Tour (October 20, 2009)
 Imagine: Rescue Vet (October 29, 2009)
 Imagine: Babyz Fashion (February 3, 2010)
 Imagine: Resort Owner  (June 22, 2010) (known as Imagine Dream Resort  in Europe)
 Imagine: Sweet 16 (October 9, 2010) (known as "Sweet 16" in Europe)
 Imagine: Animal Doctor Care Center (January 18, 2011)
 Imagine: Fashion Stylist (June 21, 2011) (known as Imagine: Fashion Paradise in Europe)
 Imagine: Fashion Life (May 8, 2012)
 Imagine: Babies 3D (August 6, 2012)
 Imagine: Fashion World 3D (October 27, 2012)
 Imagine: Championship Rider 3D (February 23, 2013)

References 

Imagine
Video game franchises
Video games developed in Italy
Video games developed in Brazil
Video games developed in Canada
Video games developed in France
Imagine
Magic Pockets games